How I Married My High School Crush is a romantic telemovie broadcast by LMN. Aired on July 1, 2007, it stars Katee Sackhoff and Kim Poirier. Its working titles included Be Careful What You Wish For and Once Upon a Dream.

Plot
Sara has been madly in love with popular classmate Brian ever since preschool and dreams of marrying him. He is unaware of her existence. A solar eclipse inexplicably transports them from high school in 1990 to the day of their wedding in 2007. Sara in reality is a 17-year-old (Katee Sackhoff), seen by those around her as  thirty-something (along with Brian), her dream marriage has come true, and she and Brian are not prepared for adulthood. Sara is in an election campaign for Lieutenant Governor and Brian is a wealthy investment banker. They find that what they have become is not what they appreciate. Brian is responsible for fraud at his investment company, and discovers that he is having an affair with his secretary. Sara finds out that she has become cruel and unreasonable in her quest for her dreams and has lost touch with her family and best friend (Katie). Sara decides that the only way to fix what has happened is to go back in time. She enlists the help of Katie's daughter to help her find how to get back to 1990. Sara discovers that to travel back in time she must be in the same place and time that the eclipse happened in 1990. But when Brian gets arrested for fraud and tax evasion, Sara must come to his rescue as his lawyer. During the trial Sara and Brian find out that Brian's ex-girlfriend is the judge of his trial, they plead not guilty, and the bail is set at $100,000. In the end, they go back in time and forgot that they were married.

Cast
 Katee Sackhoff as Sara Jacob
 Sage Brocklebank as Brian Porterson
 Kim Poirier as Kate Duncan
 Tommy Lioutas as Daniel Bock
Nikki Elek as Michelle Duncan
Anita Smith as Charlotte
 Stephen Huszar as older Tim
Jaden Ryan as younger Tim
Robin Clark as Principal Ruff

References

External links

Official Lifetime Site - Official Site

2007 television films
2007 films
Canadian comedy television films
Lifetime (TV network) films
English-language Canadian films

Films about weddings
Films about time travel
American comedy television films
Films directed by David Winkler
2000s American films
2000s Canadian films